Tuqtamış is a rural locality (a derevnya) in Biektaw District, Tatarstan. The population was 108 as of 2010.

Tuqtamış is located 25 km northeast of Biektaw, district's administrative centre, and 51 km north of Qazan, republic's capital, by road.
The earliest known record of the settlement dates from 1599. It forms part of the district since 1965.

There are 3 streets in the village.

References

External links 
 

Rural localities in Vysokogorsky District